Yeduguri Sandinti Jagan Mohan Reddy (born 21 December 1972) also known as Y. S. Jagan or mononymously Jagan, is an Indian entrepreneur and politician serving as the 17th and current chief minister of Andhra Pradesh since 30 May 2019. He is the founder and president of the Indian political party, YSR Congress Party (YSRCP). He is also the son of Y. S. Rajasekhara Reddy, former Chief Minister of Andhra Pradesh.

Jagan Mohan Reddy started his political career in the Indian National Congress and was elected as the Member of Parliament of Kadapa in 2009.  After his father's death due to helicopter crash in 2009, he started Odarpu Yatra (a consoling tour) across the state. He then eventually came out of the Congress Party and established his own party, YSR Congress Party which also matches his father's acronym, YSR.

In 2014 Andhra Pradesh Legislative Assembly elections, YSRCP won 67 seats and he became the Leader of the Opposition. Five years later, in 2019 Andhra Pradesh Legislative Assembly elections, he led the party to a landslide and never before seen victory in the state elections by winning 151 seats of the total 175 assembly segments.

Early life
Jagan Mohan Reddy was born in  Christian Reddy family in Jammalamadugu in Kadapa district of Andhra Pradesh to Y. S. Rajasekhara Reddy and Y. S. Vijayamma.

He studied at The Hyderabad Public School up to 12th grade. Tollywood actor  Sumanth Kumar Yarlagadda was his best friend at school.

He graduated with a Bachelor of Commerce degree from Pragathi Mahavidyalaya Degree and PG college, Ram Koti, Hyderabad

Reddy married Bharathi on 28 August 1996. The couple has two daughters, the elder of whom studied undergraduate in London.

Reddy has a younger sister, Y. S. Sharmila, who is also a politician.

Business ventures
Reddy first acquired Sandur Power Company Limited (SPCL), a defunct power project from its original promoter M B Ghorpade in 2001. SPCL later invested crores of rupees in other companies and could acquire more businesses. It is headed by his wife, Y. S. Bharathi. Reddy sold his shares in SPCL and moved away from his active direct businesses as he got more involved in politics.

Political career
Reddy's father Y. S. Rajasekhara Reddy, popularly known as YSR, was a two-time chief minister of Andhra Pradesh, serving from 2004 to 2009. He started his political career campaigning for Indian National Congress during the 2004 elections in Kadapa district. In 2009, he was elected as Member of Parliament from Kadapa Lok Sabha constituency.

Following the death of his father in September 2009, he started efforts to take up the political legacy left by his father. The majority of the legislators favoured him to be appointed as the Chief Minister, but this choice was not approved by party leaders Sonia and Rahul Gandhi.

Six months after his father's death, he began an odarpu yatra (condolence tour), as promised earlier, to go and meet the families of those alleged to have either committed suicide or suffered ill health on the news of his father's death. The Congress party's central leadership directed him to call off his odarpu yatra, an order which he defied leading to a fallout between the high command and himself. He went ahead with the yatra, stating that it was a personal matter.

2010–2014: Founding of YSR Congress Party 
Following the fallout with the Congress party high command, on 29 November 2010, he resigned from Kadapa Lok Sabha constituency and has also quit the party. His mother, Vijayamma, has also resigned from Pulivendula Assembly constituency and has quit the party as well. He announced on 7 December 2010 from Pulivendula that he would be starting a new party within 45 days. In March 2011, he announced that he would launch the new party, named YSR Congress Party, at Jaggampeta, East Godavari district. Later, his party went to by-polls in Kadapa district and won almost all the seats with a huge majority. Reddy, as the president of YSR Congress, faced by-election from the Kadapa constituency and won by a large margin of 545,043 votes. His mother has also won the Pulivendula Assembly constituency by 85,193 votes against Y. S. Vivekananda Reddy.

Embezzlement charges
On 27 May 2012, Reddy was arrested by the Central Bureau of Investigation (CBI) on embezzlement charges. CBI summoned Reddy for allegedly amassing huge assets through illegal means by using his father's office, Y. S. Rajasekhara Reddy, when he was the chief minister. CBI and ED has also summoned 58 companies of investing in Reddy's businesses, for the favours they allegedly received in the form of mining leases, allotments of projects. His judicial custody was extended repeatedly as the investigation proceeded. The Supreme Court of India dismissed his Bail petition on 4 July 2012, 9 August 2012, 7 November 2012, 9 May 2013, 13 May 2013.

The YSR Congress Party and Reddy's family have been alleging a political conspiracy behind Reddy's investigations. While in jail, Reddy started a hunger strike opposing the United Progressive Alliance's decision to endorse the creation of a separate Telangana state. After 125 hours of indefinite hunger strike, his sugar levels and blood pressure were down. He was moved to Osmania General Hospital for treatment. His mother, Vijayamma, was also on hunger strike protesting the formation of Telangana. After his release, Reddy called for a 72-hour bandh protesting the formation of Telangana. Both Reddy and his mother resigned from their legislatures opposing the decision favouring the formation of Telangana.

2014–2019: Leader of opposition and Padayatra 
In 2014, the YSR Congress Party was a pre-poll favourite among most analysts and psephologists. But, the YSRCP has lost the 2014 elections, winning only 67 of 175 seats in the state assembly, with 45% of vote share. The Telugu Desam Party vote share went up to 47% and the 2% gap led to the defeat of YSRCP.

As a leader of the Opposition in Assembly and YSR Congress Party's president, Reddy launched his 3,000-km-long walkathon named Praja Sankalpa Yatra, popularly called padayatra, on 6 November 2017 at Idupulapaya in Kadapa district. YSR Congress party coined a slogan "Raavali Jagan, Kaavali Jagan" for the foot march that took him across 125 Assembly segments all over the state in 430 days and ended on 9 January 2019.

Reddy while boarding a flight to Hyderabad was attacked with a cock fighting knife in the VIP Lounge of Visakhapatnam Airport on 25 October 2018. He received a lacerated injury on his shoulder and had to undergo a surgery.

2019–present: Chief Minister
In the 2019 National and State election held in April and May 2019, YSR Congress Party swept the polls and won 151 of the total 175 assembly seats and 22 of the 25 Lok Sabha seats in Andhra Pradesh. He took oath as the Chief Minister on 30 May 2019. His chief ministership has been marked by a slew of welfare schemes such as Jagananna Amma Vodi, Navaratnalu. Jagananna Amma Vodi provides financial assistance for mothers or guardians from the Below Poverty Line, to educate their children. Navaratnalu is a collection of nine welfare schemes covering farmers, women, medical and health, education and Special Category Status. He scrapped the plans for a new capital at Amaravati, proposed by the former TDP government, and has proposed three different capitals for the judicial, administrative and legislative branches at Kurnool, Amaravati and Visakhapatnam respectively. The proposal resulted in widespread protests by the farmers of Amaravati. The Andhra Pradesh High Court in a March 2022 ruling directed the Government of Andhra Pradesh to continue developing Amaravati and adjudicated that the government "lacked the competence to make any legislation for shifting, bifurcating or trifurcating the capital".

Other works
Reddy founded the Telugu daily newspaper Sakshi and the television channel Sakshi TV. He also served as the chief promoter of Bharathi Cements.

References

External links

|-

|-

Living people
1972 births
Indian Anglicans
People from Kadapa district
India MPs 2009–2014
People from Rayalaseema
Indian National Congress politicians
Lok Sabha members from Andhra Pradesh
Leaders of the Opposition in the Andhra Pradesh Legislative Assembly
Indian political party founders
YSR Congress Party politicians
People charged with corruption
Prisoners and detainees of India
YSR Congress Party
Chief Ministers of Andhra Pradesh
Telugu politicians
Government of Andhra Pradesh
Indian Christians
Andhra Pradesh MLAs 2014–2019
Andhra Pradesh MLAs 2019–2024
People named in the Paradise Papers